is the 9th single from the Japanese idol group Idoling!!! and was released under the sub-unit name . It reached number 17 on the Oricon weekly chart and sold 7,316 copies in the first week.

Contents 
Te no Hira no Yūki was released only in a Normal Edition (CD only).

Track listing

CD

Notes 
 "Te no Hira no Yūki" was used as an opening theme song in the Konami game Tokimeki Memorial 4 for the PlayStation Portable. This song was the only song performed under the sub-unit "Tokimeki Idoling!!!".
 "Rainy Girl", despite being included in this sub-unit single release, was performed by all Idoling!!! members.
 Sub-unit "Tokimeki Idoling!!!" members are #3 Mai Endō, #6 Erica Tonooka, #9 Rurika Yokoyama, #11 Suzuka Morita, #17 Hitomi Miyake, #19 Yurika Tachibana, and #20 Ai Ōkawa.
 #11 Suzuka Morita did not appear in the "Te no Hira no Yūki" music video due to her being occupied with TV Asahi's Samurai Sentai Shinkenger filming schedule.
 "Tokimeki Idoling!!!" features all of the members wearing school uniforms inspired by Tokimeki Memorial 4. At the time this single was released, all members were active school girls except for #3 Mai Endō.

References

External links 
 Te no Hira no Yūki on iTunes Japan
 Idoling!!! official site - Fuji TV
 Idoling!!! official site - Pony Canyon
 Idoling!!! official Twitter
 Idoling!!! official Facebook Page
 Idoling!!! official YouTube Channel
 Idoling!!! official Niconico Channel

2009 singles
Idoling!!! songs
2009 songs
Pony Canyon singles